WDHI (100.3 FM) is a radio station broadcasting a classic rock format. Licensed to Delhi, New York, United States, the station is owned by Townsquare Media.

In September 2022, WDHI shifted its format from classic hits to classic rock as "100.3 & 94.7 The Eagle".

References

External links

DHI
Townsquare Media radio stations
Classic rock radio stations in the United States
Radio stations established in 1992
1992 establishments in New York (state)